Arlene Dunn is a Canadian Progressive Conservative politician who has represented Saint John Harbour in the Legislative Assembly of New Brunswick since 2020.

Dunn is a member of the Executive Council of New Brunswick.

References 

Living people
Progressive Conservative Party of New Brunswick MLAs
Women MLAs in New Brunswick
21st-century Canadian politicians
21st-century Canadian women politicians
Year of birth missing (living people)
Women government ministers of Canada